Dacian War(s) may refer to:

 Domitian's Dacian War, two punitive expeditions mounted as a border defense against raids of Moesia from Dacia in 86–87 AD ordered by the Emperor Titus Flavius Domitianus against Dacia and the Dacian king Decebalus
 Trajan's Dacian Wars, two campaigns of conquest ordered or led by the Emperor Trajan in 101–102 AD and 105–106 AD from Moesia against Dacia and Decebalus